Wolfgang Kindl (born 18 April 1988) is an Austrian world champion luger who has competed since 2007.

Competitive career
At the FIL European Luge Championships 2010 in Sigulda, he won silver medals in the men's singles and mixed team events.
At the 5 December 2014 men's singles event in Lake Placid, New York, Kindl placed second, behind American Tucker West, with Dominik Fischnaller of Italy coming in third. Kindl finished the 2014-15 Luge World Cup third overall in the men's singles discipline.  During the following 2015-16 Luge World Cup season, Kinda finished 2nd in the men's singles category. behind Felix Loch of Germany.  In the 2017-17 Luge World Cup campaign Kindl finished third behind respectively, the repeating world champion, Felix Loch, and Roman Repilov of Russia.  The next year was Kindl's best Luge World Cup season finish so far as he finished as the champion in men's spring singles event for the 2017–18 and also placed second in the men's singles event standings.

Kindl represented Austria at the 2010 Winter Olympics in Vancouver, British Columbia, Canada, finishing ninth in the men's singles.  Kinda reprised representing Austria in the 2014 Winter Olympics held in Sochi, Russia and again finished ninth in the men's singles event. At the 2018 Winter Olympics staged in PyeongChang, South Korea Kindl represented Austria for the third time and again finished ninth in the men's singles event for the third consecutive time.  Kindl at last obtained an Olympic medal when he won silver in the singles event in the 2022 Beijing games.  Kindl finished behind only German Johannes Ludwig.

References

External links

1988 births
Living people
Austrian male lugers
Lugers at the 2010 Winter Olympics
Lugers at the 2014 Winter Olympics
Lugers at the 2018 Winter Olympics
Lugers at the 2022 Winter Olympics
Medalists at the 2022 Winter Olympics
Olympic silver medalists for Austria
Olympic lugers of Austria
Olympic medalists in luge
Sportspeople from Innsbruck
21st-century Austrian people